Aboutorab Naficy (ابوتراب نفیسی) (2007–1914) was an Iranian physician and heart specialist, receiving the latter specialization from Harvard University.  He was a professor of medicine at Isfahan University’s Medical School and a member of Iranian Encyclopedia of Medical Sciences (فرهنگستان علوم پزشگی ایران).  In addition to teaching at the university and in related hospitals and serving as the dean of the medical school for some time, he maintained a private practice of his own for about five decades.  Among his qualities were the manner in which he combined knowledge and techniques of modern medicine with those of the traditional medical practices of Iran as well as his sharp observations and accurate diagnostic skills.

Early life
Naficy was born in 1914 in the small village of Pudeh (today's Puyan Shahr) near Isfahan, and he died in November 2007 in Isfahan. Generations of his ancestors were physicians or physician-scholars.

Naficy attended a screening of the film Behind the Doctor in Isfahan on 17 March 1944. The film was about the diagnosis of diphtheria and ended with a question and answer period afterwards. Through such methods, surgical techniques were promulgated through Iran.

Naficy describes his life in his memoir:
“I went through elementary school in three and a half years (instead of the normal six years); I graduated from Saadi High School in 1930, and from Tehran University’s School of Medicine, in 1936.  During my medical school years, I was consistently at the top of my class, where I received the highest Medal of Science.  After completing my military service in 1939, I supervised the operation of the Kazeruni Clinic in Isfahan.  In 1946, I became Associate Professor of Botany at the Institute of Public Health, and in 1948 I became Professor of Clinical Medicine at both Institute of Public Health and Isfahan University’s Medical School where I also served as Director of Internal Medicine Department.  In 1952-53, I undertook Harvard University’s heart speciation postdoc courses.  Thereafter I travelled extensively for research, including to England, France, Italy, Switzerland, Israel, Lebanon, Syria, Egypt, Cyprus, and Jordan.  In 1963, I was honored with France’s Order of Public Health (Ordre de la Sante Publique).  In that same year, I was appointed Dean of School of Medicine and Pharmacology at Isfahan University and Director of the Department of Internal and Children’s Medicine.”

Career

Between the 1950s and the 1970s, he taught and published textbooks about modern medicine, while continuing his research into, and publications about, traditional medicine, herbal medicine, and Islamic medicine. For a time, he served as director of the Institute for the Study of Traditional Medicine at Isfahan University's School of Medicine. He retired from the university in 1981 and in 1990 was recognized as the Distinguished Permanent member of the Iranian Encyclopedia of Medical Sciences. He continued to see patients in his private clinic until he was eighty years old.

Works
Naficy published 22 books in his lifetime as well as 80 articles.  His books are listed below. All these books are written in Persian.

Modern medicine

 Semiology of the Illnesses of the Nervous System. Isfahan: Emami Printing House, 1951.
 Principles of Cardiography. Isfahan: Isfahan University/Daad Printing House, 1960.
 Semiology of Heart and Lung. Isfahan: Shahsavari Bookshop, 1961.
 Semiology of Digestion. Isfahan: Rah Nejat Publisher, Shahsavari Bookshop, 1962.
 Semiology of Chest. Isfahan: Rah Nejat Publisher, 1962
 How to Learn (First Lesson: How to Learn Medicine). Isfahan: Isfahan University, 1969.
 Introduction to Learning Techniques in Medical Science. Isfahan: Isfahan University, 1976.
 For One Who Has No Physician to Attend Him (Man la Yahduruhu Al-Tabib) (من لا يحضره الطبيب). Abū Bakr Muḥammad ibn Zakariyyā al-Rāzī, (Translated by Naficy) Tehran: Tehran University. September 1984. 
 A Brief History of Medical Sciences to Present Century. Isfahan: Isfahan University, 1986.
 History of Medical Ethics. Isfahan: Isfahan University, 1992.

Traditional medicine

 Investigation into the Traditional Medical Beliefs Among Iranians. Isfahan: Mash’al Publisher, 1985.
 Traditional Beliefs of Iranians: About Physical and Mental Health and Treatments of Common Illnesses. Isfahan: Isfahan University, 1989.
 Properties of Foods and Beverages Through Centuries Among Different Nations of the World. Isfahan: Isfahan University Jihad Daneshgahi, 1983, reprinted 2014.

Religious topics

 Humans, Successors for God on Earth. Tabriz: Azar Abadegan Publisher, 1965
 An Analytic Study of Young Peoples’ Problems. Isfahan: Kanun Elmi va Tarbiyati-ye Jahan-e Islam, 1970.
 Islam and Contemporary Knowledge. Isfahan: Qaem Publisher, 1971.
 Humankind, Masterpiece of Creation. Tabriz: Tabriz University. 1971.
 Examination of Fasting from the Medical Science’s Perspective.  Qom: Maktab Islam, 1971.
 How to Raise Children and How Different Countries Raise Their Children. Bita Publisher

Books about Dr. Aboutorab Naficy

Pulse of Life: From Traditional Medicine to Modern Medicine of Iran: Life and Works of Dr. Aboutorab Naficy. Nasrin Naficy and Mehdy Naficy, eds. Isfahan: Naqsh Khorshid Publication, 2001.
نبض حیات: در گذر طب سنتی و طب نوین ایران. زندگی و آثار دکتر ابوتراب نفیسی. به اهتمام نسرین نفیسی، مهدی نفیسی. 1380، انتشارات نقش خورشید، اصفهان

Life History and Scientific and Cultural Contributions of Dr. Aboutorab Naficy. Tehran: Society for Cultural Traditions and Accomplishments (in Persian), March 2015. 
زندگی نامه و خدمات علمی و فرهنگی مرحوم دکتر ابوتراب نفیسی. انجمن آثار و مفاخر فرهنگی، اسفند 1393، تهران

Aboutorab Naficy. My Life in Medicine (in Persian). Nasrin Naficy, ed. Isfahan: Mani Publication and School of Medical Sciences of Isfahan University, 2018. 
زندگی پزشگی من. دکتر ابوتراب نفیسی. به اهتمام نسرین نفیسی، انتشارات مانی، با همکاری دانشگاه علوم پزشکی اصفهان، 1396، اصفهان

References

1914 births
2007 deaths
Iranian surgeons
20th-century surgeons
Academic staff of Isfahan University of Medical Sciences